FBI: Most Wanted is an American crime drama television series created by René Balcer and produced by Wolf Entertainment that was ordered to series by CBS in May 2019. It is the first spin-off from Dick Wolf's drama FBI, in whose first season the characters of the series were introduced. The series premiered on January 7, 2020.

In May 2020, the series was renewed for a second season; which premiered on November 17, 2020. In March 2021, CBS renewed the series for a third season; which premiered on September 21, 2021.

In May 2022, CBS renewed the series for a fourth and fifth season. The fourth season premiered on September 20, 2022.

Premise 
The series focus on the work of FBI’s Fugitive Task Force which relentlessly tracks and captures the notorious and dangerous criminals on the FBI’s Most Wanted list. Overseeing the team is FBI Supervisory Special Agent Jess LaCroix, a seasoned, enigmatic agent at the top of his game who uses his expert profiling skills to help apprehend the most dangerous criminals. Throughout Season 1, the task force includes Special Agents Sheryll Barnes, a ex-New York Police Department Detective with a degree in behavioral psych who serves as the team’s second in command; Kenny Crosby, a United States Army Millitary Intelligence vet Jess has taken under his wing; Hana Gibson, the team's intelligence analyst; and Clinton Skye, one of the most experienced field agents on the team and the brother of Jess's deceased wife.  

In season 2, Skye is put on special assignment to the Bureau of Indian Affairs and is eventually replaced by Special Agent Ivan Ortiz, an ex-Los Angeles Police Department gang officer with street cop instincts. In the season 3 premiere, Crosby is put on medical leave (after being wounded by a former Army comrade during an investigation) and replaced by Special Agent Kristin Gaines, a rising star from the FBI's Miami field office. Later, in the second half of the season, LaCroix is shot and killed by a fugitive, which devastates the rest of the team. He is eventually replaced by Supervisory Special Agent Remy Scott - fresh off a multi-year stint with the FBI's Las Vegas field team - as team leader. Near the end of the season, Ortiz takes time away from the task force to care for his ailing father in Los Angeles. By season 4, he has transferred back to Los Angeles permenantly and is soon replaced by rookie Special Agent Ray Cannon, an ex-New Orleans Police Department Detective whose father was part of the bureau.

Cast

Main 
 Julian McMahon as Jesse “Jess” LaCroix, (seasons 1–3), FBI Supervisory Special Agent and Team Leader. He is the widower of deceased US Army Intelligence officer Angelyne Skye LaCroix and the father of Natalia "Tali" Skye LaCroix as well as the brother-in-law of FBI Special Agent Clinton Skye. He is also a profiler which he uses to get into the mindset of a criminal the team is chasing and determine their patterns of behavior. In the FBI Season 1/ FBI: Most Wanted backdoor pilot episode, "Most Wanted", it's revealed that Jess worked alongside Jubal Valentine, the Assistant Special in Charge of the FBI's New York field office on the Haynes Spree Killer case and in the FBI Season 2/FBI: Most Wanted Season 1 crossover episode, "American Dreams", it's also revealed that the two men worked together some time in the past. In the FBI: Most Wanted Season 3 episode, "Shattered", during the hunt for a violent fugitive, Jess is shot in the neck and despite Barnes and Ortiz attempting to treat him, dies off-screen from his wounds, devastating the team and his family. He is later replaced by FBI Special Agent Remy Scott who becomes the Fugitive Task Force's new leader.
 Kellan Lutz as Kenny Crosby, (seasons 1–3), FBI Special Agent and ex-Army Intelligence officer. Following the departure of FBI Special Agent Clinton Skye who also served as the team's sharpshooter, Crosby becomes the team's newest sharpshooter/sniper. After being shot and left badly wounded during the FBI Season 4 premiere episode, "All That Glitters", having assisted New York field agents Maggie Bell and OA Zidan on a case, Crosby survives but returns home to Oklahoma to begin a long process of recovery with FBI Special Agent Kristin Gaines, an agent assigned to the FBI's Miami field office replacing him.
 Roxy Sternberg as Sheryll Barnes, FBI Special Agent and second in command of the Fugitive Task Force. She is also a former Detective with the New York Police Department and is the wife of Charlotte Gaines, a lawyer as well as the mother of their children, a girl named Anais and a boy named Theo.
 Keisha Castle-Hughes as Hana Gibson, FBI Special Agent and Intelligence Analyst for the Team. She is also the team's hacker, often providing them with information they need on their latest case.
 Nathaniel Arcand as Clinton Skye (seasons 1–2), FBI Special Agent and LaCroix’s brother-in-law. He is also the team's sniper/sharpshooter, providing them with cover in the event of a hostage situation and also has a Juris Doctor degree. He later leaves the team to go work on a case concerning public corrupt which involves the FBI Director recruiting agents who have Juris Doctor degrees. Following Clinton's departure, fellow FBI agent Kenny Crosby, FBI Special Agent Ivan Ortiz and later FBI Special Agent Ray Cannon become the team's new sharpshooters.
 YaYa Gosselin as Tali LaCroix (season 2–3; recurring season 1), daughter of Jess LaCroix and his wife, Angelyne and niece of Clinton Skye. Her full name is Natalia "Tali" Skye LaCroix. In the FBI: Most Wanted Season 3 episode, "Incendiary", she leaves her father's home to go attend "Beersheba Springs", a full-time equestrian academy/boarding school located in Canada which will also see her living close to her grandparents.
 Miguel Gomez as Ivan Ortiz (season 2–3), an FBI agent originally from Los Angeles and who worked with the FBI's counter-terrorism unit in Washington D.C. before he became a member of the Fugitive Task Force. Prior to joining the FBI, Ortiz also worked as a Gang officer for the LAPD. Following the departure of FBI agent Kenny Crosby, Ortiz becomes the team's sniper. Later departs the team in the FBI: Most Wanted Season 3 episode, "Inheritance", having gotten some time off to care for his sick father in LA. FBI team leader Remy Scott later reveals during the FBI: Most Wanted Season 4 episode, "Taxman" that Ortiz has transferred back to Los Angeles on a permanent basis, resulting in him leaving the Fugitive Task Force so that he can continue looking after his father while also working as an FBI agent.
 Alexa Davalos as Kristin Gaines (season 3–present), A former Office of Naval Intelligence officer and FBI Special Agent formerly with the Miami Field Office. She is the ex-wife of Nick Vargas and mother of their two children, Jack and Ingrid. After originally assisting the team on a case concerning a sex trafficking ring that was seen during the FBI Season 4 premiere episode, "All That Glitters", Kristin officially joins the team in the FBI: Most Wanted Season 3 episode, "Patriots", replacing Kenny Crosby who had returned to his native Oklahoma to recover from wounds sustained in the same episode.
 Dylan McDermott as Remy Scott (season 3–present), FBI Supervisory Special Agent and Jess's replacement as Team Leader. He is the son of Betsy Scott and the brother of Claire and Mikey Scott.
 Edwin Hodge as Ray Cannon (season 4), FBI Special Agent and former NOPD cop who later became a junior detective as well as the newest member of the Fugitive Task Force. Cannon later attended Quantico and graduated at the top of his class. He also worked at the FBI's Violent Crimes division in Albany prior to joining the Fugitive Task Force. He is also the son of an unnamed man who is a retired FBI agent, Cannon deciding to follow in his father's footsteps. In addition to being a member of the team, Cannon also serves as the team's sniper/sharpshooter

Recurring 
 Lorne Cardinal as Nelson Skye (seasons 1–2), father of Clinton Skye, father-in-law of Jess LaCroix and grandfather of Tali LaCroix.
 Irene Bedard as Marilou Skye (seasons 1–2), mother of Clinton Skye, mother-in-law of Jess LaCroix and grandmother of Tali LaCroix.
 Amy Carlson as Jackie Ward (season 2), veteran bounty hunter.
 Terry O'Quinn as Byron LaCroix (season 2–3), father of Jess LaCroix and grandfather of Tali LaCroix.
 Jen Landon as Sarah Allen (season 2–3), Jess's girlfriend.

Notable guest stars 
 Henry Thomas as Dr. Justin Brock (in "Dopesick").
 Joshua Malina as Paul Hayden, FBI Counterintelligence Agent (in "Silkworm").
 Chris Tardio as Mike Fitts, FBI Special Agent In Charge of the Indian Country Crime Unit (in "The Line").
 Victor Williams as Moses Reed, OIG Special Agent (in "Chattaboogie").
 Tim DeKay as Angelo Carpentier (in "Unhinged").
 Beshoy Mehany as Diego (in "Succession").
 Kristof Konrad as Aleksander Pavlishchev (in "A Man Without a Country").

Crossover characters 
 Missy Peregrym as FBI Special Agent Maggie Bell (FBI).
 Zeeko Zaki as FBI Special Agent Omar Adom "OA" Zidan (FBI).
 Ebonée Noel as FBI Special Agent Kristen Chazal (FBI).
 John Boyd as FBI Special Agent Stuart Scola (FBI).
 Alana de la Garza as FBI Special Agent in Charge Isobel Castile (FBI).
 Jeremy Sisto as FBI Assistant Special Agent in Charge Jubal Valentine (FBI).

Episodes

Series overview

Backdoor pilot (2019)

For the backdoor pilot, "No. overall" and "No. in season" refer to the episode's place in the order of episodes of the parent series FBI.

Season 1 (2020)

Season 2 (2020–21)

Season 3 (2021–22)

Season 4 (2022–23)

Production

Development 
On January 29, 2019, it was announced that CBS had commissioned a backdoor pilot with an attached series commitment for a potential spin-off series titled FBI: Most Wanted with the episode to air in the latter part of the first season. The series will focus on the division of the FBI tasked with tracking and capturing the most notorious criminals on the FBI's Most Wanted list. According to Dick Wolf, the spin-off is set to launch a series of interconnected shows similar to that both of Wolf's Chicago and Law & Order franchises on NBC. On May 9, 2019, CBS announced that FBI: Most Wanted had been ordered to series. A few days later, it was announced that the series would premiere as a mid-season replacement in the winter-spring of 2020. The series premiered on January 7, 2020. On March 13, 2020, it was announced that Universal Television has suspended the production due to the COVID-19 pandemic. On May 6, 2020, CBS renewed the series for a second season, which premiered on November 17, 2020. On August 28, 2020, it was announced that showrunner René Balcer would be leaving the series and David Hudgins would be taking over for the second season.

On March 24, 2021, CBS announced that the series was renewed for a third season, which premiered on September 21, 2021.

On May 9, 2022, CBS renewed the series for a fourth and fifth season. The fourth season premiered on September 20, 2022.

Release

Marketing
On May 15, 2019, CBS released the first official trailer for the series.

Broadcast
The show airs on Tuesday nights in Canada on Global and airs it  three hours ahead of CBS broadcast .

The show airs on Friday nights at 10pm on Sky Witness in the United Kingdom.

The show airs on Thursday night at 10:40pm on AXN Asia in the Southeast Asia, then moved to FOX Asia.

Reception

Ratings

Overall

Season 1

Season 2

Season 3

Season 4

Notes

References

External links 
  on Wolf Entertainment
  on CBS
 
 

 
2020 American television series debuts
2020s American crime drama television series
2020s American police procedural television series
American television spin-offs
CBS original programming
English-language television shows
 
FBI (TV series)
 Television shows set in New York (state)
Television series by CBS Studios
Television series by Universal Television
Television series by Wolf Films
Television productions suspended due to the COVID-19 pandemic